Prof Friedrich Stromeyer FRS(For) FRSE (2 August 1776 – 18 August 1835) was a German chemist. He was the discoverer of cadmium.

From 1982 a Friedrich Stromeyer Prize has been awarded for chemical achievement in Germany.

Life
He was born in Göttingen on 2 August 1776 the eldest son of Dr Ernerst Johann Friedrich Stromeyer, professor of medicine at Göttingen University, and his wife, Marie Magdalena Johanne von Blum.

Stromeyer studied Chemistry and Medicine at Göttingen and Paris and received an MD degree from the University of Göttingen in 1800, studying under Johann Friedrich Gmelin and Louis Nicolas Vauquelin. He was then a professor at the university, and also served as an inspector of apothecaries. His students included Robert Bunsen.

In 1817, whilst studying compounds of zinc carbonate, Stromeyer discovered the element cadmium. Cadmium is a common impurity of zinc compounds, though often found only in minute quantities.  He was also the first to recommend starch as a reagent for free iodine and he studied chemistry of arsine and bismuthate salts.

In 1819 he was the first scientist to describe the mineral eudialyte.

In 1826 he was elected a Fellow of the Royal Society of Edinburgh his proposer being Edward Turner. As his fellowship was Ordinary (rather than Foreign or Honorary) this means he was physically present in Edinburgh at that time. The following year he was elected a Foreign Fellow of the Royal Society of London.

In 1832 the mineral stromeyerite was named in his honour by mineralogist François Sulpice Beudant.

He died in Göttingen on 18 August 1835 aged 59.

References
 Lockemann, Georg; Oesper, Ralph E. Friedrich Stromeyer and the history of chemical laboratory instruction, J. Chem. Educ. 1953, 30, pp. 202–204.
 I. Asimov, Asimov's Biographical Encyclopedia of Science and Technology (2nd Ed.), Doubleday, 1982, pp. 276–277.
 M.E. Weeks, Discovery of the Elements (7th Ed.), Leicester, H. M., Ed., J. Chem. Educ., 1968, pp. 502–508.
 J. R. Partington, A History of Chemistry, Macmillan, 1962, vol. 3, pp. 659–660.
 Biographisches Lexikon der hervorragenden Ärzte, Urban & Schwarzenberg, 1962, vol. 5, p. 566.

External links 
 

1776 births
1835 deaths
19th-century German chemists
Scientists from Göttingen
Discoverers of chemical elements
University of Göttingen alumni
Foreign Members of the Royal Society
Cadmium